Max Headroom is an American satirical science fiction television series by Chrysalis Visual Programming and Lakeside Productions for Lorimar-Telepictures that aired in the United States on ABC from March 31, 1987, to May 5, 1988. The series is set in a futuristic dystopia ruled by an oligarchy of television networks, and features the character and media personality Max Headroom. The story is based on the Channel 4 British TV film produced by Chrysalis, Max Headroom: 20 Minutes into the Future.

Premise 
In the future, an oligarchy of television networks rules the world.  Even the government functions primarily as a puppet of the network executives, serving mainly to pass laws—such as banning "off" switches on televisions—that protect and consolidate the networks' power. Television technology has advanced to the point that viewers' physical movements and thoughts can be monitored through their television sets. Almost all non-television technology has been discontinued or destroyed. The only real check on the power of the networks is Edison Carter, a crusading investigative journalist who regularly exposes the unethical practices of his own employer, and the team of allies both inside and outside the system who assist him in getting his reports to air and protecting him from the forces that wish to silence or kill him.

Characters

Edison Carter 
Edison Carter (Matt Frewer) is a hard-hitting reporter for Network 23, who sometimes uncovered things that his superiors in the network would have preferred be kept private. Eventually, one of these instances required him to flee his workspace, upon which he was injured in a motorcycle accident in a parking lot.

The series depicted very little of the past described by Edison. He met a female televangelist (whom he had dated in college) when his reporting put him at odds with the Vu Age Church that she now headed. Edison was sent on a near-rampage to avenge a former colleague, who died as a result of a story on dream-harvesting.

Edison cares about his co-workers, especially Theora Jones and Bryce Lynch, and he has a deep respect for his producer, Murray (although he rarely shows it).

Max Headroom 

Max Headroom (Frewer) is a computer reconstruction of Carter, created after Bryce Lynch uploaded a copy of his mind. He appears as a computer-rendered bust of Carter superimposed on a wire-frame background. Since Carter's last sight before the motorcycle crash was the sign "Max. headroom" on a parking garage gate, these were the reconstruction's first words and ultimately his name. While Carter is a dedicated professional, Max is a wisecracking observer of human contradictions.

Despite being the titular character, Max sparsely appeared on the show. While he occasionally played a significant part in a plot—sometimes by traveling through networks to gain information or by revealing secrets about Carter that Carter himself would not divulge—his most frequent role was as comic relief, delivering brief quips in reaction to certain events or giving a humorous soliloquy at the end of an episode.

Theora Jones 
Theora Jones first appeared in the British-made television pilot film for the series. She was Network 23's star controller ("stolen" from the World One Network by Murray) and, working with Edison, the network's star reporter, she often helped save the day for everyone. She was also a potential love interest for Edison, but that subplot was not explored fully on the show before it was cancelled.

Network 23's personnel files list her father as unknown, her mother as deceased, and her brother as Shawn Jones; Shawn is the focus on the second episode broadcast, "Rakers".

Theora Jones was played by Amanda Pays, who along with Matt Frewer and W. Morgan Sheppard, was one of only three cast members to also appear in the American-made series that followed.

Ben Cheviot 
Cheviot (George Coe), was one of the executives on Network 23's board of directors. He later becomes the board's new chairman after Ned Grossberg is fired in the wake of the Blipvert incident. He is mostly ethical and almost invariably backs Edison Carter, occasionally against the wishes of the Network 23 board of directors.  However, he has compromised himself on a few occasions when he felt the ratings for the Network would rise using methods that were questionable such as allowing the network to copyright the exclusive news of a terrorist organization, and mixing sex and politics.  He once had an affair with board member Julia Fornby, though by the start of the show they had ended it long ago.  Cheviot, while usually rolling over for his greatest client, did not do so when they attempted to supplant television networks themselves.

Bryce Lynch 
Bryce Lynch (Chris Young), a child prodigy and computer hacker, is Network 23's one-man technology research department.

In the stereotypical hacker ethos, Bryce has few principles and fewer loyalties. He seems to accept any task, even morally questionable ones, as long as he is allowed to have the freedom to play with technology however he sees fit. This, in turn, makes him a greater asset to the technological needs and demands of the network, and the whims of its executives and stars. However, he also generally does not hurt or infringe on others, making him a rare neutral character in the Max Headroom universe.

In the pilot episode of the series, Bryce is enlisted by evil network CEO Ned Grossberg (Charles Rocket) to investigate the mental patterns of unconscious reporter Edison Carter, to determine whether or not Carter has discovered the secrets of the "Blipverts" scandal. Bryce uploads the contents of Carter's memory into the Network 23 computer system, creating Max Headroom. It had been Bryce, following orders from Grossberg, who fought a hacking battle of sorts with Theora Jones that led to Edison hitting his head on a traffic barrier and falling unconscious.

After the first episode, Bryce is generally recruited by Carter and his controller, Theora Jones, to provide technical aid to their investigative reporting efforts.

Murray McKenzie 
Murray (Jeffrey Tambor), Carter's serious and high-strung producer, whose job often becomes a balancing act between supporting Carter's stories and pleasing Network 23's executives.  In his younger years he was also a field reporter and may have had some experience with the systems of a controller, though the system in his younger years had changed since and would not be reliable to replace one.  When creating the "What I Want To Know Show" it was a toss-up between Eddison Carter and another reporter and Murray "Choose The Best" a decision that would have future repercussions.  Murray is divorced and sees his kids on weekends.

Blank Reg 
Reg (W. Morgan Sheppard) is a "blank", a person not indexed in the government's database. He broadcasts the underground Big Time Television Network from his bus. He is a good friend of Edison Carter, and saves him on more than one occasion.  With colleague/lover Dominique, he operates and is the onscreen voice of Big Time television, "All day every day, making tomorrow seem like yesterday."

He dresses in a punk style and has a Mohawk haircut.  He has an energetic personality and a strong nostalgic streak, defending antiquated music videos and printed books in equal measure, despite not having the ability to read.

Ned Grossberg 
Ned Grossberg is a recurring villain on the series, played by former Saturday Night Live cast member Charles Rocket.

In the pilot episode, Grossberg is the chairman of Network 23, a major city television station with the highest-rated investigative-news show in town, hosted by Edison Carter. In the Max Headroom world, real-time ratings equal advertising dollars, and advertisements have replaced stocks as the measure of corporate worth.

Grossberg, with his secret prodigy Bryce Lynch, develops a high-speed advertising delivery method known as Blipverts, which condenses full advertisements into a few seconds. When Carter discovers that Blipverts are killing people, Grossberg orders Lynch to prevent Carter from getting out of the building. Knocked unconscious, Carter's memories are extracted into a computer by Lynch in order to determine whether Carter uncovered Grossberg's knowledge of the danger of Blipverts. The resulting computer file of the memory-extraction process becomes Max Headroom, making Grossberg directly responsible for the creation of the character. In the end, Grossberg is publicly exposed as responsible for the Blipverts scandal, and is removed as chairman of Network 23.

A few episodes later, in "Grossberg's Return", Grossberg reappears as a board member of Network 66. Again, he invents a dubious advertising medium and convinces the chairman of the network to adopt it. When the advertising method is shown to be a complete fraud, the resulting public reaction against the network leads to the chairman being removed, and Grossberg manages to assume the chairmanship.

When under stress, Grossberg exhibits a tic of slightly stretching his neck in his suit's collar, first seen in episode 1 when he confronts Lynch in his lab regarding Max retaining Carter's memory about the blipverts.

In the UK telefilm Max Headroom: 20 Minutes Into the Future upon which the American series was based, the character was called Grossman and was played by Nickolas Grace. Rocket portrayed Grossberg as an American yuppie with a characteristic facial and neck-stretching twitch.

Other characters
Dominique (Concetta Tomei), co-proprietor of Big Time TV along with Blank Reg, managing the business aspects of running the station. It is implied that she and Reg are romantically involved, if not husband and wife. Although Dominique may not be a blank like Reg, as she possesses credit tubes, she behaves culturally as one.
Breughel (Jere Burns), an intelligent, sociopathic criminal-for-hire who, along with Mahler, makes money disposing of corpses for other criminals by selling them to body banks around the city. However, he is not above selling out his employers if it means a big payoff, a fact which Edison Carter takes advantage of on several occasions while working on stories.
Mahler (Rick Ducommun), Breughel's accomplice, who serves primarily as the muscle of the duo's body-harvesting operation. In "Dream Thieves", it is revealed that Breughel killed Mahler and sold off his body during a slow night of business, and replaced him with a new man whom he nicknamed "Mahler" as a mocking tribute.
Rik (J.W. Smith), a streetwise pedicab driver whom Edison Carter frequently employs when looking for information about the city's underworld.
Blank Bruno (Peter Crook), Bryce's mentor, who is a revolutionary Blank who works to make life better for the city's Blank population by any means short of murder. He has a pet toad, which he calls "Gob".
Blank Traker (Brian Brophy, Season 1 / Michael Preston, Season 2), one of Bruno's fellow revolutionaries. 
Martinez (Ricardo Gutierrez), one of Network 23's helicopter pilots, he often works with Carter when he is out on assignment.
Janie Crane (Lisa Niemi), one of Network 23's second-tier reporters, who ends up breaking a few important stories of her own throughout the series.
Angie Barry (Rosalind Chao), one of Network 23's second-tier reporters. She often fills-in for Carter when he is indisposed.
Joel Dung Po (Rob Narita), one of Network 23's second-tier reporters.
Julia Formby (Virginia Kiser), one of Network 23's board members. In "Body Banks", it is revealed that she once had an affair with Cheviot, for which she is blackmailed by a wealthy member of the Plantagenet family into stealing Max Headroom from Network 23 in the hope that Max's program might be used to preserve the mind of his mother.
Gene Ashwell (Hank Garrett), one of Network 23's board members, who frequently panics when the network faces a crisis. It is revealed in "Deities" that he is a member of the Vu-Age Church, and is responsible for kidnapping Max on behalf of the church's leader.
Ms. Lauren (Sharon Barr), one of Network 23's board members.  Replaced Formby on the board after Formby grew weary of "handling things at night".
Mr. Edwards (Lee Wilkof), one of Network 23's board members.  He has a groveling disposition, and regards ratings as more important than life itself. Once cried at the thought of no one watching the network, and compared the potential end of network television to the end of the world.
Simon Peller (Sherman Howard), a corrupt politician who receives financial backing from Network 23. He shares a mutual animosity with Carter, who despises Peller's underhanded political tactics.
Mr. Bartlett (Andreas Katsulas), one of the board members of Network 66. An incautious risk-taker, he frequently becomes directly involved in the network's shady projects, going behind even Ned Grossberg's back on occasion.
Chubb Shaw (James F. Dean), one of the board members of Network 66.
Dragul (John Durbin), a Network censor who disregards Blanks, and lives by the orders of computers even in defeat.
Ped Xing (Arsenio Trinidad, Season 1 / Sab Shimono, Season 2), the head of the Zik-Zak corporation, Network 23's primary sponsor.
Stew, Blipvert Victim (Brian Healy), a viewer whose head explodes from watching blipverts, impelling Edison Carter to investigate Network 23.

Development and production
The series was based on the Channel 4 British TV film produced by Chrysalis, Max Headroom: 20 Minutes into the Future. Cinemax aired the UK pilot followed by a six-week run of highlights from The Max Headroom Show, a UK music video show where Headroom appears between music videos. ABC took an interest in the pilot and asked Chrysalis/Lakeside to produce the series for American audiences.

Max Headroom: 20 Minutes into the Future was re-shot as a pilot program for a new series broadcast by the U.S. ABC television network. The pilot featured plot changes and some minor visual touches, but retained the same basic storyline. The only original cast retained for the series were Matt Frewer (Max Headroom/Edison Carter) and Amanda Pays (Theora Jones); a third original cast member, W. Morgan Sheppard, joined the series as "Blank Reg" in later episodes. Among the non-original cast, Jeffrey Tambor co-starred as "Murray", Edison Carter's neurotic producer.

The show went into production in late 1986 and ran for six episodes in the first season and eight in the second.

Episodes

Season 1 (1987)

Season 2 (1987–88)

Notes 
Although unaired as part of the original U.S run, "Baby Grobags" was shown as part of the Australian series run.
At least one unproduced script, "Theora's Tale", has surfaced, as have the titles of two other stories ("The Trial" and "Xmas"). Currently, little is known of "The Trial" aside from its title; George R. R. Martin wrote "Xmas", in pre-production at cancellation time; "Theora's Tale" would have featured the "Video Freedom Alliance" kidnapping Theora, and war in Antarctica, between rival advertisers Zik Zak and Zlin.

Home media
Shout! Factory (under license from Warner Bros. Home Entertainment) released Max Headroom: The Complete Series on DVD in the United States and Canada on August 10, 2010. The bonus features includes a round-table discussion with most of the major cast members (other than Matt Frewer), and interviews with the writers and producers.

Reception
The series began as a mid-season replacement in spring of 1987, and did well enough to be renewed for the fall television season, but the viewer ratings could not be sustained in direct competition with CBS's Top 20 hit Dallas (also produced by Lorimar) and NBC's Top 30 hit Miami Vice. Max Headroom was canceled part-way into its second season. The entire series, along with two previously unbroadcast episodes, was rerun in spring 1988 during the Writers Guild of America strike. In the late 1990s, U.S. cable TV channels Bravo and the Sci-Fi Channel re-ran the series. Reruns also briefly appeared on TechTV in 2001. A cinema spin-off titled Max Headroom for President was announced with production intended to start in early 1988 in order to capitalize on the 1988 United States presidential election, but it was never made.

Max Headroom has been called "the first cyberpunk television series", with "deep roots in the Western philosophical tradition".

See also
The Max Headroom Show
Max Headroom signal hijacking

References

Further reading

External links

 
 
 
 
 The Max Headroom Chronicles—fan site

1980s American science fiction television series
1987 American television series debuts
1988 American television series endings
American Broadcasting Company original programming
Cyberpunk television series
English-language television shows
Max Headroom
Television series about journalism
Television series about television
Television series by Lorimar Television
Television series set in the future
Transhumanism in fiction
Transhumanism in television series
Television shows set in Los Angeles
Television series by Lorimar-Telepictures
Works about computer hacking